The St. Louis Southwestern Railway (Cotton Belt Route) Caboose #2325 is a historic railroad caboose.  It was built in 1920 by the St. Louis Southwestern Railway (aka the Cotton Belt) at its Pine Bluff, Arkansas shop, and is one of only a few surviving 2300-series cabooses.  It was used by the railroad on its Paragould-Blytheville route, and was acquired by the Paperton Junction Southern Railway in 1980 and restored.

The caboose was listed on the National Register of Historic Places in 2006.  At that time, it was located at the Paperton Junction Southern Railway rail yard in Pine Bluff.

See also
National Register of Historic Places listings in Jefferson County, Arkansas

References

Buildings and structures completed in 1883
Buildings and structures in Pine Bluff, Arkansas
National Register of Historic Places in Pine Bluff, Arkansas
Railway vehicles on the National Register of Historic Places in Arkansas
Cabooses